X-Gluc is a chemical compound with the molecular formula C14H13BrClNO7. It is used as a reagent to detect β-glucuronidase, an enzyme produced by the E. coli bacterium. It is used to detect E. coli contamination in food, water and the urinary tract. In addition, it is widely used in molecular biology experiments to mark and select the expression of target genes (GUS reporter system).

It is often preferred to other detection methods because it is fast (24-hour testing), relatively accurate ( <1% false negatives and <5% false positives ) and the result is easy to observe and interpret. The reagent is safe to transport and easy to store.

See also 
 Bacteriological water analysis
 X-gal

References

External links 
 X-Gluc lab exercise, Susan J Karcher, Purdue University
 Histochemical localization of GUS reporter activity in plant tissues, Stanislav Vitha, Texas A&M University

Indoles
Chloroarenes
Glucuronide esters
Bromoarenes
Reagents